Ákos Gulyás (born 14 August 1942) is a retired Hungarian swimmer who won a bronze medal in the 4 × 100 m medley relay at the 1966 European Aquatics Championships. He competed in the 4 × 100 m freestyle relay and 200 m backstroke at the 1964 Summer Olympics, but did not reach the finals.

References

1942 births
Living people
Swimmers at the 1964 Summer Olympics
Olympic swimmers of Hungary
Hungarian male swimmers
Sportspeople from Debrecen
European Aquatics Championships medalists in swimming
Male backstroke swimmers